Diamantino is a municipality in Mato Grosso state in Brazil. It has a population of 22,178 and is near Diamantino River. Its history dates from 1730 as a gold mining settlement. In 1746, diamonds were discovered, which made the town's population swell and prosper. The amount of diamonds was greatly overestimated, and the town population steadily declined.

Near the city is the South American pole of inaccessibility, which means that no place in South America is as far from the nearest ocean as this point. The closest ocean is the Pacific Ocean, at the Peruvian-Chilean border.

References

Municipalities in Mato Grosso